The Third Power is a 1991 album by the New York based music group Material. The album mixes reggae. funk, dub and rap music.

Engineer Martin Bisi claims the album began as a Sly and Robbie record but "Bill really took over... And then, before you know it, the record's done and they're staring at something that they don't recognize... suddenly [they] woke up and were like, 'This is not our record and we don't want it to come out with our name on it,' and Bill just ended up calling it a Material record, The Third Power".

The Jamaican reggae rhythm section of Sly and Robbie write and perform, and there is a vocal by dancehall singer Shabba Ranks on the opening track.

Bootsy Collins from the Parliament-Funkadelic collective is also prominent as a writer and performer, and others from the p-funk collective include Gary Mudbone Cooper, Bernie Worrell, Michael Hampton and Garry Shider, and the Horny Horns of Fred Wesley, Maceo Parker and Pee Wee Ellis.

From the world of jazz, Herbie Hancock and Henry Threadgill contribute. Rappers Baby Bam and Mike G from the Jungle Brothers provide vocals on one track, and The Last Poets' Jalaluddin Mansur Nuriddin contributes vocals to two.

"Reality" was issued as a CD single in 1993 (Axiom/Island, AXMCD 2) with the album version, "Virtual Reality Mix" by Bill Laswell and "Dancehall Mix" by Sly Dunbar. The "Virtual Reality Mix" was included on Axiom Collection: Manifestation.

"Playin' with Fire" was issued as a 12" single in 1992 (Axiom/Island, 422-866 499-1) featuring mixes "Ft. Greene Playground" and "Hip Brick Burnout Remix" by Eric Sadler and Chris Champion, and "Third Power Version" and "Praxis Edit" by Bill Laswell and Jason Corsaro. The "Praxis Edit" was included on Axiom Collection: Manifestation.

"Cosmic Slop" is a cover from Funkadelic's 1973 song Cosmic Slop, which also appeared on Axion Funk: Funkcronomicon and Axiom Collection: Illuminations.

"Mellow Mood" is a cover of Bob Marley and The Wailers 1967 single.

Track listing
"Reality" (Shabba Ranks, Bill Laswell, Sly Dunbar, Robbie Shakespeare) – 5:15
"Playin' with Fire" (Nathaniel Hall, Michael Small, Laswell, Bootsy Collins, Dunbar, Shakespeare) – 5:14
"Cosmic Slop" (George Clinton, Bernie Worrell) – 5:15
"E-Pluribus-Unum" (Jalaluddin Mansur Nuriddin, Laswell, Dunbar, Shakespeare) – 3:40
"Drive-By" (Laswell, Dunbar, Shakespeare) – 3:21
"Power of Soul (Black Chant)" (Nuriddin, Laswell, Collins, Dunbar, Shakespeare) – 5:24
"Mellow Mood" (Bob Marley) – 4:22
"Glory" (Laswell, Collins, Dunbar, Shakespeare) – 4:33

Personnel

Material
Bill Laswell – production

Additional musicians
Jungle Brothers (Baby Bam and Mike G) – vocals ("Playin' with Fire")
Jalaluddin Mansur Nuriddin – vocals ("E-Pluribus-Unum", "Power of Soul (Black Chant)")
Shabba Ranks – vocals ("Reality")
Bootsy Collins – backing vocals and guitar
Gary Shider – vocals ("Cosmic Slop") and guitar
Gary Mudbone Cooper – backing vocals
Jenny Peters – backing vocals
Herbie Hancock – piano
Bernie Worrell – piano and organ
Jeff Bova – synths
Henry Threadgill – flute
Robbie Shakespeare – bass
Nicky Skopelitis – guitar and Fairlight CMI
Michael Hampton – guitar
Aïyb Dieng – percussion
Sly Dunbar – drums and drum programming

Brass section
Arranged and conducted by Henry Threadgill
Olu Dara – cornet and African trumpet
Joe Daley – baritone horn
Richard Harper – euphonium
Marcus Rojas – tuba
Joel Brandon – whistling

String section
Material strings arranged and conducted by Karl Berger

Horn section
Fred Wesley – trombone
Maceo Parker – alto sax
Pee Wee Ellis – tenor sax

Production
Recorded at Greenpoint Studio, B.C. Studio and Platinum Island Studio, New York.
Produced by Bill Laswell.
Engineers Robert Musso, Oz Fritz and Martin Bisi.
Mixed by Jason Corsaro at Platinum Island Studios
Cover by Thi-Linh Le.

Release history
1991 – Axiom / Island, 422-848-417-2 (CD)
1991 – Axiom / Island / BMG, 926 9526 (CD)

References

External links 
 
 The Third Power at Bandcamp

1991 albums
Material (band) albums
Albums produced by Bill Laswell
Axiom (record label) albums